Zirconium hydride describes an alloy made by combining zirconium and hydrogen. Hydrogen acts as a hardening agent, preventing dislocations in the zirconium atom crystal lattice from sliding past one another. Varying the amount of hydrogen and the form of its presence in the zirconium hydride (precipitated phase) controls qualities such as the hardness, ductility, and tensile strength of the resulting zirconium hydride. Zirconium hydride with increased hydrogen content can be made harder and stronger than zirconium, but such zirconium hydride is also less ductile than zirconium.

Material properties
Zirconium is found in the Earth's crust only in the form of an ore, usually a zirconium silicate, such as zircon. Zirconium is extracted from zirconium ore by removing the oxygen and silica. This process, known as the Kroll process, was first applied to titanium. The Kroll process results in an alloy containing hafnium. The hafnium and other impurities are removed in a subsequent step. Zirconium hydride is created by combining refined zirconium with hydrogen. Like titanium, solid zirconium dissolves hydrogen quite readily.

The density of zirconium hydride varies based the hydrogen and ranges between 5.56 and 6.52 g cm−3.

Even in the narrow range of concentrations which make up zirconium hydride, mixtures of hydrogen and zirconium can form a number of different structures, with very different properties. Understanding such properties is essential to making quality zirconium hydride. At room temperature, the most stable form of zirconium is the hexagonal close-packed (HCP) structure α-zirconium. It is a fairly soft metallic material that can dissolve only a small concentration of hydrogen, no more than 0.069 wt% at 550 °C. If zirconium hydride contains more than 0.069% hydrogen at zirconium hydride making temperatures then it transforms into a body-centred cubic (BCC) structure called β-zirconium. It can dissolve considerably more hydrogen, more than 1.2% hydrogen above 900 °C.

When zirconium hydrides with less than 0.7% hydrogen, known as hypoeutectoid zirconium hydride, are cooled from the β phase the mixture attempts to revert to the α phase, resulting in an excess of hydrogen.

Another polymorphic form is the γ phase, is generally accepted to be a metastable phase.

Zirconium hydrides are odorless, dark gray to black metallic powders.
They behave as usual metals in terms of electrical conductivity and magnetic properties (paramagnetic, unless contaminated with ferromagnetic impurities). Their structure and composition is stable at ambient conditions. Similar to other metal hydrides, different crystalline phases of zirconium hydrides are conventionally labeled with Greek letters, and α is reserved for the metal. The known ZrHx phases are γ (x = 1),  δ (x = 1.5–1.65) and ε (x = 1.75–2). Fractional x values often correspond to mixtures, so the compositions with x = 0.8–1.5 usually contain a mixture of α, γ and δ phases, and δ and ε phases coexist for x = 1.65–1.75. As a function of increasing x, the transition between δ-Zr and ε-Zr is observed as a gradual distortion of the face-centered cubic δ (fluorite-type) to face-centered tetragonal ε lattice. This distortion is accompanied by a rapid decrease in Vickers hardness, which is constant at 260 HV for x < 1.6, linearly decreases to 160 HV for 1.6 < x < 1.75 and stabilizes at about 160 HV for 1.75 < x < 2.0. This hardness decrease is accompanied by the decrease in magnetic susceptibility. The mass density behaves differently with the increasing hydrogen content: it decreases linearly from 6.52 to 5.66 g/cm3 for x = 0–1.6 and changes little for x = 1.6–2.0.

Preparation and chemical properties
Zirconium hydrides form upon interaction of the metal with hydrogen gas. Whereas this reaction occurs even at room temperature, homogeneous bulk hydrogenation is usually achieved by annealing at temperatures of 400–600 °C for a period between several hours and a few weeks. At room temperature, zirconium hydrides quickly oxidize in air, and even in high vacuum. The formed nanometer-thin layer of oxide stops further oxygen diffusion into the material, and thus the change in composition due to oxidation can usually be neglected. However, the oxidation proceeds deeper into the bulk with increasing temperature. The hydrogen is anionic due to the electronegativity difference between Zr and H. When prepared as thin films, the crystal structure can be improved and surface oxidation minimized.

Zirconium hydrides are soluble in hydrofluoric acid or alcohol; they react violently with water, acids, oxidizers or halogenated compounds.

Applications
Formation of zirconium hydrides is an important factor in the operation of several types of nuclear reactors, such as boiling water reactors Fukushima I and II, which suffered from a series of explosions caused by the 2011 Tōhoku earthquake and tsunami. Their uranium fuel pellets are enclosed in metal rods made from Zircaloy – an alloy of typically about 98.25% zirconium with 1.5% tin and minor amounts of other metals. Zircaloy is used because of its small absorption cross-section for thermal neutrons and superior mechanical and corrosion properties to those of most metals, including zirconium. The rods are cooled by streaming water which gradually oxidizes zirconium, liberating hydrogen. In Fukushima reactors, the reactor cooling system failed because of the tsunami. The resulting temperature increase accelerated chemical reactions and caused accumulation of significant amounts of hydrogen, which exploded upon reaction with oxygen when the gas was released to the atmosphere.

In regular operation, most hydrogen is safely neutralized in the reactor systems; however, a fraction of 5-20% diffuses into the Zircaloy rods forming zirconium hydrides. This process mechanically weakens the rods because the hydrides have lower hardness and ductility than metal. Only a few percent of hydrogen can dissolve in zirconium. Excess hydrogen forms voids that weaken Zircalloy. Among Zircaloys, Zircaloy-4 is the least susceptible to hydrogen blistering.

It is also used as a neutron moderator in thermal-spectrum nuclear reactors such as the TRIGA research reactor developed by General Atomics or the Soviet TOPAZ nuclear reactors. At neutron energies above 0.14 eV it is as effective at moderating a nuclear reactor as elemental hydrogen (the best known material), but far more dense, and therefore permits compact reactors with high power per unit volume.  It has neutron resonances that prevent almost all moderation at energies below 0.14 eV. Zirconium deuteride is superior, because it has a lower neutron absorption cross-section than aneutronic hydrogen, decreasing neutron absorption in a reactor.

As a pure powder, zirconium hydrides are used as hydrogenation catalysts, in powder metallurgy, and as getters in the vacuum tube industry. In vacuum system, zirconium hydrides help establish a seal between a metal and ceramic. In this method, a hydride powder (particularly ZrH4) is mixed with the sealing metal; heating the mixture results in decomposition of the hydride. The evolving hydrogen cleans up the surrounding area, and the produced metal flows and forms a seal even at temperatures as low as 300 °C.

ZrH2 is used in powder metallurgy, as a hydrogenation catalyst, and as a reducing agent, vacuum tube getter, and a foaming agent in production of metal foams. Other uses include acting as a fuel in pyrotechnic compositions, namely pyrotechnic initiators.

Safety
Powdered zirconium hydrides are flammable and can ignite and explode if exposed to heat, fire, or sparks. When heated above 300 °C, they decompose releasing hydrogen gas, which is also flammable.

References

External links
Google books search results for the dedicated conference named "Zirconium in the nuclear industry"

Metal hydrides
Zirconium alloys
Neutron moderators